Harvey Bayard Freeman (December 22, 1897 – January 10, 1970) was an American professional baseball pitcher. He played for the 1921 Philadelphia Athletics of Major League Baseball (MLB).

Biography
Freeman played college baseball and college football at Western State Normal School, now Western Michigan University, and was signed by Connie Mack of the Philadelphia Athletics in 1921. During 1921, his only major league season, Freeman pitched in 18 games (four starts) with the Athletics. He compiled a 1–4 win–loss record with a 7.69 earned run average (ERA) and five strikeouts in 48 innings pitched. His one win was a complete game victory on August 9, as the Athletics defeated the Cleveland Indians, 4–3. Freeman had a .083 batting average (1-for-12), while defensively he made no errors in 19 total chances for a 1.000 fielding percentage.

In May 1922, the Athletics sent Freeman to the minor league Portland Beavers of the Pacific Coast League as part of a multi-player trade. Baseball records show that Freeman played for three different minor league teams during 1922, did not play in 1923, returned in 1924 with the Syracuse Stars of the International League, then finished his professional baseball career with two teams during 1925. He pitched in 80 minor league games, accruing a 20–35 record.

Freeman went on to coach multiple sports at St. Augustine High School in Kalamazoo, Michigan, from 1925 to 1954, where his basketball teams won five state championship. He then worked in the lumber business. Freeman was inducted to the hall of fame of the Michigan High School Coaches Association in 1965. He was married, with two daughters and a son, and died in January 1970 in Kalamazoo.

References

External links

1897 births
1970 deaths
Major League Baseball pitchers
Philadelphia Athletics players
Decatur Commodores players
Portland Beavers players
Denver Bears players
Syracuse Stars (minor league baseball) players
Quincy Red Birds players
Greenville Hunters players
Kalamazoo Celery Pickers players
Baseball players from Michigan
People from St. Joseph County, Michigan
Western Michigan Broncos baseball players
Western Michigan Broncos football players
High school basketball coaches in Michigan